La Barge is a town in Lincoln County, Wyoming, United States. The population was 551 at the 2010 census. It is approximately 20 miles from Big Piney. The area around La Barge is rich in oil fields, and the town has one bar and four churches.

History
The town is named for Joseph Marie La Barge, Senior a French-Canadian voyageur turned fur trapper, mountain man, and steamboat operator, and father of the famed riverboat captain Joseph LaBarge. He was born in L'Assomption, Quebec, on 4 July 1787, and came to the U.S. in 1808 canoeing to St. Louis, Missouri, where he met and married a woman of Spanish and French descent, Eulalie Becquette Alvarez-Hortiz. His trapping days began at Cabanne's Trading Post in Nebraska Territory, and continued throughout the West during the 1830s and 1840s after his children were born.

Geography
La Barge is located at  (42.261139, -110.196974).

Climate

According to the Köppen Climate Classification system, La Barge has a warm-summer humid continental climate, abbreviated "Dfb" on climate maps.

Demographics

2010 census
As of the census of 2010, there were 551 people, 233 households, and 141 families living in the town. The racial makeup of the town was 92.4% White, 0.4% African American, 4.4% Native American, 0.9% from other races, and 2.0% from two or more races. Hispanic or Latino of any race were 4.4% of the population.

There were 233 households, of which 30.0% had children under the age of 18 living with them, 52.4% were married couples living together, 5.2% had a female householder with no husband present, 3.0% had a male householder with no wife present, and 39.5% were non-families. 29.6% of all households were made up of individuals, and 10.8% had someone living alone who was 65 years of age or older. The average household size was 2.36 and the average family size was 3.02.

The median age in the town was 37.8 years. 26.5% of residents were under the age of 18; 5.9% were between the ages of 18 and 24; 25.6% were from 25 to 44; 32.4% were from 45 to 64; and 9.4% were 65 years of age or older. The gender makeup of the town was 53.9% male and 46.1% female.

2000 census
As of the census of 2000, there were 431 people, 168 households, and 113 families living in the town. The population density was 494.8 people per square mile (191.3/km2). There were 234 housing units at an average density of 268.6 per square mile (103.8/km2). The racial makeup of the town was 96.06% White, 0.46% Native American, 0.23% Pacific Islander, 0.70% from other races, and 2.55% from two or more races. Hispanic or Latino of any race were 1.86% of the population.

There were 168 households, out of which 41.1% had children under the age of 18 living with them, 56.5% were married couples living together, 6.5% had a female householder with no husband present, and 32.7% were non-families. 26.8% of all households were made up of individuals, and 5.4% had someone living alone who was 65 years of age or older. The average household size was 2.57 and the average family size was 3.19.

In the town, the population was spread out, with 32.5% under the age of 18, 5.8% from 18 to 24, 31.3% from 25 to 44, 24.1% from 45 to 64, and 6.3% who were 65 years of age or older. The median age was 38 years. For every 100 females, there were 114.4 males. For every 100 females age 18 and over, there were 112.4 males.

The median income for a household in the town was $38,542, and the median income for a family was $45,179. Males had a median income of $47,222 versus $18,438 for females. The per capita income for the town was $18,837. About 9.2% of families and 12.3% of the population were below the poverty line, including 13.2% of those under age 18 and 8.6% of those age 65 or over.

Education
Public education in the town of La Barge is provided by Sublette County School District #9. Schools serving the town include La Barge Elementary School (grades K-5), Big Piney Middle School (grades 6–8), and Big Piney High School (grades 9-12).

La Barge has a public library, a branch of the Lincoln County Library System.

See also
 Cabanne's Trading Post

References

External links

Towns in Wyoming
Towns in Lincoln County, Wyoming